Tin King may refer to:

Places 
 Tin King Estate, a public housing estate in Tuen Mun, Hong Kong
 Tin King stop, an MTR Light Rail stop adjacent to the estate

People 
 Dexter Young (Yeung Tin-king), Hong Kong actor
 William B. Leeds, American businessman

Others
 Tin King (constituency), a constituency in Tuen Mun District